Canadian National 3254 is a class "S-1-b" 2-8-2 "Mikado" type steam locomotive built by the Canadian Locomotive Company for the Canadian National Railway as the fifth member of the Canadian National class S-1-b.

History

Revenue service 
Canadian National 3254 was built in 1917 by the Canadian Locomotive Company for the Canadian Government Railways where it was originally numbered as No. 2854. In 1918, the Canadian Government Railways was merged with the Canadian Northern Railway to create the Canadian National Railway (CN). During a subsequent renumbering process within the locomotive fleet, No. 2854 was renumbered to No. 3254. The locomotive had considerable pulling power, could climb grades without incident, and was used to pull heavy freight trains. No. 3254 had a mostly uneventful career, the locomotive continued to pull freight trains for CN, until its last major class 3 overhaul was completed in Allendale, Ontario, and it was retired from revenue service in February 1958.

Preservation 
After being stored for three years, the locomotive was sold in November 1961 to motel owner Willis F. Barron, who moved it to Ashland, Pennsylvania, and he had intentions to run the locomotive on the Reading Company's abandoned branchline that served the town. The rails in Ashland were ripped up before Barron's planned venture could begin operation, so he had No. 3254 disassembled, moved via truck, and reassembled at his Ashland Court Motel to be used as a static display. During the 1970s, Barron lost interest in restoring No. 3254 to operating condition, so it was sold to the Adirondack Railroad in Lake Placid, New York, but it was never delivered there.

Gettysburg Railroad 
In 1982, it was sold again to the Gettysburg Railroad, who disassembled it to be hauled by truck to Gettysburg. It was subsequently reassembled and restored to operating condition in 1985, it began pulling excursion trains between Gettysburg and Mount Holly Springs. It also participated in that year's National Railway Historical Society (NRHS) convention alongside Huntingdon and Broad Top Mountain Railroad 2-8-0 No. 38. During its time at Gettysburg, however, the locomotive proved to be oversized and overpowered for the railroad's needs, so it only operated there for a year and a half until it was once again put into storage in 1986.

Steamtown 
Meanwhile, Steamtown National Historic Site in Scranton needed a larger locomotive to meet the demand for greater motive power to pull their longer excursion trains. In August 1987, No. 3254 was moved to Steamtown after they traded Canadian Pacific 1278 and $100,000 for the locomotive. The locomotive was repainted as Delaware, Lackawanna and Western (DLW) No. 1271, and it was put into service that same month. After the National Park Service (NPS) acquired Steamtown, No. 3254 was reverted to its CN appearance. In 1995, the locomotive participated in the grand opening of Steamtown's main roundhouse alongside multiple other locomotives, including Canadian Pacific 2317, Baldwin Locomotive Works 26, Reading Blue Mountain and Northern Railroad 425, Susquehanna SY 2-8-2 No. 142, and Milwaukee Road 261.

Disposition 
Steamtown also owns Canadian National 3377, which became a spare parts provider for the locomotive. The tender from No. 3377 replaced No. 3254 original tender in 2010 due to rust leaks; the original tender would later be scrapped. As a result of issues with either the boiler/firebox or the frame, combined with other needed maintenance which made further operation impractical, the locomotive made its last run on December 2, 2012. It was taken out of service after the 2012 holiday season, and it was subsequently awaiting its 1,472 day inspection and rebuild. Steamtown later decided to officially retire it from excursion service indefinitely due to its poor condition. The early retirement is likely attributed due to its bent frame of its 1941 collision, it has frequently been described as a "rough rider," and had been chewing up bearings at an accelerated rate. It also consumed a staggering amount of coal compared to the amount consumed by Canadian Pacific 2317. 

As of 2022, the engine still remains on static display, with no plans on returning to service anytime soon, due to its poor condition and bent frame. Boston and Maine 3713 will be replacing No. 3254 as Steamtown's main line excursion locomotive once restored to operation. Additionally, despite being used for parts, sister locomotive No. 3377 will be the next candidate restoration.

1941 accident 
On July 24, 1941, the engine collided head on with Great Northern Railway 1351 at North Road cut near Burnaby, British Columbia. The accident caused the engine's frame horns to be bent with the frame itself also being bowed to one side, causing the cab to sit off-centered. Despite being badly damaged with a bent frame after the accident, CN loosely repaired the locomotive and it continued service.

Gallery

See also
Grand Trunk Western 4070
Nickel Plate Road 587
Grand Canyon Railway 4960
Southern Railway 4501
Soo Line 1003
Boston and Maine 3713

References

2-8-2 locomotives
Individual locomotives of Canada
3254
Preserved steam locomotives of Canada
CLC locomotives
Standard gauge locomotives of the United States
Standard gauge locomotives of Canada
Railway locomotives introduced in 1917
Preserved steam locomotives of Pennsylvania